A plug-in hybrid electric vehicle (PHEV) is a hybrid electric vehicle whose battery pack can be recharged by plugging a charging cable into an external electric power source, in addition to internally by its on-board internal combustion engine-powered generator. Most PHEVs are passenger cars, but there are also PHEV versions of commercial vehicles and vans, utility trucks, buses, trains, motorcycles, mopeds, and even military vehicles.

Similar to all-electric vehicles (BEVs), PHEVs displace greenhouse gas emissions from the car tailpipe exhaust to the power station generators powering the electricity grid. These centralized generators may be of renewable energy (e.g. solar, wind or hydroelectric) and largely emission-free, or have an overall lower emission intensity than individual internal combustion engines. Compared to conventional hybrid electric vehicles (HEVs), PHEVs have a larger battery pack that can be charged from the power grid, which is also more efficient and can cost less than using only the on-board generator, and also often have a more powerful electric output capable of longer and more frequent EV mode driving, helping to reduce operating costs. A PHEV's battery pack is smaller than all-electric vehicles for the same vehicle weight (due to the necessity to still accommodate its combustion engine and hybrid drivetrain), but has the auxiliary option of switching back to using its gasoline/diesel engine like a conventional HEV if the battery runs low, alleviating range anxiety especially for places that lack sufficient charging infrastructure.

Mass-produced PHEVs have been available to the public in China and the United States since 2010, with the introduction of the Chevrolet Volt which was the best selling PHEV until the end of production in 2019. By the end of 2017, there were over 40 models of highway-legal series-production PHEVs for retail sales, and are available mainly in China, Japan, the United States, Canada and Western Europe. The top-selling models are the Mitsubishi Outlander P-HEV, the Chevrolet Volt family and the Toyota Prius PHV.

, the global stock of PHEVs totaled 2.4 million units, representing one-third of the stock of plug-in electric passenger cars on the world's roads. , China had the world's largest stock of PHEVs with 767,900 units, followed by the United States with 567,740, and the United Kingdom with 159,910.

Terminology
A plug-in hybrid's all-electric range is designated by PHEV-[miles] or PHEV[kilometers]km in which the number represents the distance the vehicle can travel on battery power alone. For example, a PHEV-20 can travel  without using its combustion engine, so it may also be designated as a PHEV32km.

For these cars to be battery operated, they go through charging processes that use different currents. These currents are known as Alternating Current (AC) used for on board chargers and Direct Current (DC) used for external charging.

Other popular terms sometimes used for plug-in hybrids are "grid-connected hybrids", "Gas-Optional Hybrid Electric Vehicle" (GO-HEV) or simply "gas-optional hybrids". GM calls its Chevrolet Volt series plug-in hybrid an "Extended-Range Electric Vehicle".

History

Invention and early interest
The Lohner-Porsche Mixte Hybrid, produced as early as 1899, was the first hybrid electric car. Early hybrids could be charged from an external source before operation. However, the term "plug-in hybrid" has come to mean a hybrid vehicle that can be charged from a standard electrical wall socket. The term "plug-in hybrid electric vehicle" was coined by UC Davis Professor Andrew Frank, who has been called the "father of the modern plug-in hybrid".

The July 1969 issue of Popular Science featured an article on the General Motors XP-883 plug-in hybrid. The concept commuter vehicle housed six  lead–acid batteries in the trunk area and a transverse-mounted DC electric motor turning a front-wheel drive. The car could be plugged into a standard North American 120 volt AC outlet for recharging.

Revival of interest

In 2003, Renault began selling the Elect'road, a plug-in series hybrid version of their popular Kangoo, in Europe. In addition to its engine, it could be plugged into a standard outlet and recharged to 95% range in about 4 hours. After selling about 500 vehicles, primarily in France, Norway and the UK, the Elect'road was redesigned in 2007.

With the availability of hybrid vehicles and the rising gas prices in the United States starting around 2004, interest in plug-in hybrids increased. Some plug-in hybrids were conversions of existing hybrids; for example, the 2004 CalCars conversion of a Prius to add lead acid batteries and a range of up to  using only electric power.

In 2006, both Toyota and General Motors announced plans for plug-in hybrids. GM's Saturn Vue project was cancelled, but the Toyota plug-in was certified for road use in Japan in 2007.

In 2007, Quantum Technologies and Fisker Coachbuild, LLC announced the launch of a joint venture in Fisker Automotive. Fisker intended to build a US$80,000 luxury PHEV-50, the Fisker Karma, initially scheduled for late 2009.

In 2007, Aptera Motors announced their Typ-1 two-seater. However, the company folded in December 2011.

In 2007, Chinese car manufacturer BYD Auto, owned by China's largest mobile phone battery maker, announced it would be introducing a production PHEV-60 sedan in China in the second half of 2008. BYD exhibited it in January 2008 at the North American International Auto Show in Detroit. Based on BYD's midsize F6 sedan, it uses lithium iron phosphate (LiFeP04)-based batteries instead of lithium-ion, and can be recharged to 70% of capacity in 10 minutes.

In 2007 Ford delivered the first Ford Escape Plug-in Hybrid of a fleet of 20 demonstration PHEVs to Southern California Edison. As part of this demonstration program Ford also developed the first flexible-fuel plug-in hybrid SUV, which was delivered in June 2008. This demonstration fleet of plug-ins has been in field testing with utility company fleets in the U.S. and Canada, and during the first two years since the program began, the fleet has logged more than 75,000 miles. In August 2009 Ford delivered the first Escape Plug-in equipped with intelligent vehicle-to-grid (V2G) communications and control system technology, and Ford plans to equip all 21 plug-in hybrid Escapes with the vehicle-to-grid communications technology. Sales of the Escape PHEV were scheduled for 2012.

On January 14, 2008, Toyota announced they would start sales of lithium-ion battery PHEVs by 2010, but later in the year Toyota indicated they would be offered to commercial fleets in 2009.

On March 27, the California Air Resources Board (CARB) modified their regulations, requiring automobile manufacturers to produce 58,000 plug-in hybrids during 2012 through 2014. This requirement is an asked-for alternative to an earlier mandate to produce 25,000 pure zero-emissions vehicles, reducing that requirement to 5,000. On June 26, Volkswagen announced that they would be introducing production plug-ins based on the Golf compact. Volkswagen uses the term 'TwinDrive' to denote a PHEV. In September, Mazda was reported to be planning PHEVs. On September 23, Chrysler announced that they had prototyped a plug-in Jeep Wrangler and a Chrysler Town and Country mini-van, both PHEV-40s with series powertrains, and an all-electric Dodge sports car, and said that one of the three vehicles would go into production.

On October 3, the U.S. enacted the Energy Improvement and Extension Act of 2008. The legislation provided tax credits for the purchase of plug-in electric vehicles of battery capacity over 4 kilowatt-hours. The federal tax credits were extended and modified by the American Clean Energy and Security Act of 2009, but now the battery capacity must be over 5 kWh and the credit phases out after the automaker has sold at least 200,000 vehicles in the U.S.

Series production

On December 15, 2008, BYD Auto began selling its F3DM in China, becoming the first production plug-in hybrid sold in the world, though initially was available only for corporate and government customers. Sales to the general public began in Shenzhen in March 2010, but because the F3DM nearly doubles the price of cars that run on conventional fuel, BYD expects subsidies from the local government to make the plug-in affordable to personal buyers. Toyota tested 600 pre-production Prius Plug-ins in Europe and North America in 2009 and 2010.

Volvo Cars built two demonstration versions of Volvo V70 Plug-in Hybrids in 2009 but did not proceed with production. The V60 plug-in hybrid was released in 2011 and was available for sale.

In October 2010 Lotus Engineering unveiled the Lotus CityCar, a plug-in series hybrid concept car designed for flex-fuel operation on ethanol, or methanol as well as regular gasoline.

GM officially launched the Chevrolet Volt in the U.S. on November 30, 2010, and retail deliveries began in December 2010. Its sibling the Opel/Vauxhall Ampera was launched in Europe between late 2011 and early 2012. The first deliveries of the Fisker Karma took place in July 2011, and deliveries to retail customers began in November 2011. The Toyota Prius Plug-in Hybrid was released in Japan in January 2012, followed by the United States in February 2012. Deliveries of the Prius PHV in Europe began in late June 2012. The Ford C-Max Energi was released in the U.S. in October 2012, the Volvo V60 Plug-in Hybrid in Sweden by late 2012.

The Honda Accord Plug-in Hybrid was released in selected U.S. markets in January 2013, and the Mitsubishi Outlander P-HEV in Japan in January 2013, becoming the first SUV plug-in hybrid in the market. Deliveries of the Ford Fusion Energi began in February 2013. BYD Auto stopped production of its BYD F3DM due to low sales, and its successor, the BYD Qin, began sales in Costa Rica in November 2013, with sales in other countries in Latin America scheduled to begin in 2014. Qin deliveries began in China in mid December 2013.

Deliveries to retail customers of the limited edition McLaren P1 supercar began in the UK in October 2013, and the Porsche Panamera S E-Hybrid began deliveries in the U.S. in November 2013. The first retail deliveries of the Cadillac ELR took place in the U.S. in December 2013. The BMW i8 and the limited edition Volkswagen XL1 were released to retail customers in Germany in June 2014. The Porsche 918 Spyder was also released in Europe and the U.S. in 2014. The first units of the Audi A3 Sportback e-tron and Volkswagen Golf GTE were registered in Germany in August 2014.

In December 2014 BMW announced the group is planning to offer plug-in hybrid versions of all its core-brand models using eDrive technology developed for its BMW i brand plug-in vehicles (BMW i3 and BMW i8). The goal of the company is to use plug-in technology to continue offering high performance vehicles while reducing  emissions below 100g/km. At the time of the announcement the carmaker was already testing a BMW 3 Series plug-in hybrid prototype. The first model available for retail sales will be the 2016 BMW X5 eDrive, with the production version unveiled at the 2015 Shanghai Motor Show. The second generation Chevrolet Volt was unveiled at the January 2015 North American International Auto Show, and retail deliveries began in the U.S. and Canada in October 2015.

In March 2015 Audi said they planned on making a plug-in hybrid version of every model series, and that they expect plug-in hybrids, together with natural gas vehicles and battery-electric drive systems, to have a key contribution in achieving the company's  targets. The Audi Q7 e-tron will follow the A3 e-tron already in the market. Also in March 2015, Mercedes-Benz announced that the company's main emphasis regarding alternative drives in the next years will be on plug-in hybrids. The carmaker plans to introduce 10 new plug-in hybrid models by 2017, and its next release was the Mercedes-Benz C 350 e, Mercedes' second plug-in hybrid after the S 500 Plug-In Hybrid. Other plug-in hybrid released in 2015 are the BYD Tang, Volkswagen Passat GTE, Volvo XC90 T8, and the Hyundai Sonata PHEV.

Global combined Volt/Ampera family sales passed the 100,000 unit milestone in October 2015. By the end of 2015, over 517,000 highway legal plug-in hybrid electric cars have been sold worldwide since December 2008 out of total global sales of more than 1.25 million light-duty plug-in electric cars.

In February 2016, BMW announced the introduction of the "iPerformance" model designation, which will be given to all BMW plug-in hybrid vehicles from July 2016. The aim is to provide a visible indicator of the transfer of technology from BMW i to the BMW core brand. The new designation will be used first on the plug-in hybrid variants of the new BMW 7 Series, the BMW 740e iPerformance, and the 3 Series, the BMW 330e iPerformance.

Hyundai Motor Company made the official debut of its three model Hyundai Ioniq line-up at the 2016 Geneva Motor Show. The Ioniq Plug-in is scheduled to be released in the U.S. in the fourth quarter of 2017.

The second generation Prius plug-in hybrid, called Prius Prime in the U.S. and Prius PHV in Japan, was unveiled at the 2016 New York International Auto Show. Retail deliveries of the Prius Prime began in the U.S. in November 2016, and is scheduled to be released Japan by the end of 2016. Unlike its predecessor, the Prime runs entirely on electricity in EV mode. Global sales of the Mitsubishi Outlander P-HEV passed the 100,000 unit milestone in March 2016. BYD Qin sales in China reached the 50,000 unit milestone in April 2016, becoming the fourth plug-in hybrid to pass that mark.

In June 2016, Nissan announced it will introduce a compact range extender car in Japan before March 2017. The series plug-in hybrid will use a new hybrid system, dubbed e-Power, which debuted with the Nissan Gripz concept crossover showcased at the 2015 Frankfurt Auto Show.

This was the first hybrid minivan of any type. It was first sold in the United States, Canada, and Mexico in 2017.

In 2013, Volkswagen started production on the Volkswagen XL1, a two-person limited production diesel-powered plug-in hybrid vehicle designed to be able to travel  on diesel, while still being both roadworthy and practical. The model is built with a  TDI twin-cylinder, common-rail  turbo-diesel and a  electric motor. The model is unique in that it is one of the only mass produced plug-in diesel hybrid vehicles and one of the only mass produced diesel hybrid vehicles in general.

Technology

Powertrains

PHEVs are based on the same three basic powertrain architectures of conventional hybrids; a series hybrid is propelled by electric motors only, a parallel hybrid is propelled both by its internal combustion engine and by electric motors operating concurrently, and a series-parallel hybrid operates in either mode. While a plain hybrid vehicle charges its battery from its engine only, a plug-in hybrid can obtain a significant amount of the energy required to recharge its battery from external sources.

Charging systems
The battery charger can be on-board or external to the vehicle. The process for an on-board charger is best explained as AC power being converted into DC power, resulting in the battery being charged. On-board chargers are limited in capacity by their weight and size, and by the limited capacity of general-purpose AC outlets. Dedicated off-board chargers can be as large and powerful as the user can afford, but require returning to the charger; high-speed chargers may be shared by multiple vehicles.

Using the electric motor's inverter allows the motor windings to act as the transformer coils, and the existing high-power inverter as the AC-to-DC charger. As these components are already required on the car, and are designed to handle any practical power capability, they can be used to create a very powerful form of on-board charger with no significant additional weight or size. AC Propulsion uses this charging method, referred to as "reductive charging".

Modes of operation
A plug-in hybrid operates in charge-depleting and charge-sustaining modes. Combinations of these two modes are termed blended mode or mixed-mode. These vehicles can be designed to drive for an extended range in all-electric mode, either at low speeds only or at all speeds. These modes manage the vehicle's battery discharge strategy, and their use has a direct effect on the size and type of battery required:

Charge-depleting mode allows a fully charged PHEV to operate exclusively (or depending on the vehicle, almost exclusively, except during hard acceleration) on electric power until its battery state of charge is depleted to a predetermined level, at which time the vehicle's internal combustion engine or fuel cell will be engaged. This period is the vehicle's all-electric range. This is the only mode that a battery electric vehicle can operate in, hence their limited range.

Mixed mode describes a trip using a combination of multiple modes. For example, a car may begin a trip in low speed charge-depleting mode, then enter onto a freeway and operate in blended mode. The driver might exit the freeway and drive without the internal combustion engine until all-electric range is exhausted. The vehicle can revert to a charge sustaining-mode until the final destination is reached. This contrasts with a charge-depleting trip which would be driven within the limits of a PHEV's all-electric range.

Electric power storage

The optimum battery size varies depending on whether the aim is to reduce fuel consumption, running costs, or emissions, but a 2009 study concluded that "The best choice of PHEV battery capacity depends critically on the distance that the vehicle will be driven between charges. Our results suggest that for urban driving conditions and frequent charges every 10 miles or less, a low-capacity PHEV sized with an AER (all-electric range) of about 7 miles would be a robust choice for minimizing gasoline consumption, cost, and greenhouse gas emissions. For less frequent charging, every 20–100 miles, PHEVs release fewer GHGs, but HEVs are more cost effective."

PHEVs typically require deeper battery charging and discharging cycles than conventional hybrids. Because the number of full cycles influences battery life, this may be less than in traditional HEVs which do not deplete their batteries as fully. However, some authors argue that PHEVs will soon become standard in the automobile industry. Design issues and trade-offs against battery life, capacity, heat dissipation, weight, costs, and safety need to be solved. Advanced battery technology is under development, promising greater energy densities by both mass and volume, and battery life expectancy is expected to increase.

The cathodes of some early 2007 lithium-ion batteries are made from lithium-cobalt metal oxide. This material is expensive, and cells made with it can release oxygen if overcharged. If the cobalt is replaced with iron phosphates, the cells will not burn or release oxygen under any charge. At early 2007 gasoline and electricity prices, the break-even point is reached after six to ten years of operation. The payback period may be longer for plug-in hybrids, because of their larger, more expensive batteries.

Nickel–metal hydride and lithium-ion batteries can be recycled; Toyota, for example, has a recycling program in place under which dealers are paid a US$200 credit for each battery returned. However, plug-in hybrids typically use larger battery packs than comparable conventional hybrids, and thus require more resources. Pacific Gas and Electric Company (PG&E) has suggested that utilities could purchase used batteries for backup and load leveling purposes. They state that while these used batteries may be no longer usable in vehicles, their residual capacity still has significant value. More recently, General Motors (GM) has said it has been "approached by utilities interested in using recycled Volt batteries as a power storage system, a secondary market that could bring down the cost of the Volt and other plug-in vehicles for consumers".

Ultracapacitors (or "supercapacitors") are used in some plug-in hybrids, such as AFS Trinity's concept prototype, to store rapidly available energy with their high power density, in order to keep batteries within safe resistive heating limits and extend battery life. The CSIRO's UltraBattery combines a supercapacitor and a lead acid battery in a single unit, creating a hybrid car battery that lasts longer, costs less and is more powerful than current technologies used in plug-in hybrid electric vehicles (PHEVs).

Conversions of production vehicles

There are several companies that are converting fossil fuel non-hybrid vehicles to plug-in hybrids:

Aftermarket conversion of an existing production hybrid to a plug-in hybrid typically involves increasing the capacity of the vehicle's battery pack and adding an on-board AC-to-DC charger. Ideally, the vehicle's powertrain software would be reprogrammed to make full use of the battery pack's additional energy storage capacity and power output.

Many early plug-in hybrid electric vehicle conversions have been based on the Toyota Prius. Some of the systems have involved replacement of the vehicle's original NiMH battery pack and its electronic control unit. Others add an additional battery back onto the original battery pack.

Target market
In recent years, demand for all- electric vehicles, especially in the United States market, has been driven by government incentives through subsidies, lobbyists, and taxes. In particular, American sales of the Nissan Leaf have depended on generous incentives and special treatment in the state of Georgia, the top selling Leaf market. Among popular current all-electric vehicles, only the Tesla (with the most expensive version of the Model S offering a  range in the U.S. Environmental Protection Agency 5-cycle test) significantly exceeds this threshold.

Plug-in hybrids provide the extended range and potential for refueling of conventional hybrids while enabling drivers to use battery electric power for at least a significant part of their typical daily driving. Since building a PHEV with a longer all-electric range adds weight and cost, and reduces cargo and/or passenger space, there is not a specific all-electric range that is optimal. The accompanying graph shows the observed all-electric range, in miles, for four popular U.S. market plug-in hybrids, as tested by Popular Mechanics magazine.

This target range would allow most travel to be accomplished electrically driven and the assumption was made that charging will take place at home overnight. This requirement translated using a lithium-ion battery pack with an energy storage capacity of 16  considering that the battery would be used until the state of charge (SOC) of the battery reached 30%.

In October 2014 General Motors reported, based on data collected through its OnStar telematics system since Volt deliveries began, and with over 1 billion miles (1.6 billion km) traveled, that Volt owners drive about 62.5% of their trips in all-electric mode. In May 2016, Ford reported, based on data collected from more than 610 million miles (976 million km) logged by its electrified vehicles through its telematics system, that drivers of these vehicles run an average of  annually on their vehicles, with about half of those miles operating in all-electric mode. Ford notes that with the enhanced electric range of the 2017 model year model, the average Fusion Energi commuter could go the entire day using no gasoline, if the car is fully charged both, before leaving for work and before leaving for home. According to Ford data, currently most customers are likely charging their vehicles only at home.

The 2015 edition of the EPA's annual report "Light-Duty Automotive Technology, Carbon Dioxide Emissions, and Fuel Economy Trends" estimates the following utility factors for 2015 model year plug-in hybrids to represent the percentage of miles that will be driven using electricity by an average driver, whether in electric only or blended modes: 83% for the BMW i3 REx, 66% for the Chevrolet Volt, 45% for the Ford Energi models, 43% for the McLaren P1, 37% for the BMW i8, and 29% for the Toyota Prius PHV. A 2014 analysis conducted by the Idaho National Laboratory using a sample of 21,600 all-electric cars and plug-in hybrids, found that Volt owners traveled on average 9,112 miles in all-electric mode (e-miles) per year, while Leaf owners traveled 9,697 e-miles per year, despite the Volt's shorter all-electric range, about half of the Leaf's.

Between January and August 2014, a period during which US sales of conventional hybrids slowed, US sales of plug-in hybrids grew from 28,241 to 40,748 compared to the same period in 2013. US sales of all-electric vehicles also grew during the same period: from 29,917 vehicles in the January to August 2013 period to 40,349 in January to August 2014.

Comparison to non-plug-in hybrids

Fuel efficiency and petroleum displacement

Plug-in hybrids have the potential to be even more efficient than conventional hybrids because a more limited use of the PHEV's internal combustion engine may allow the engine to be used at closer to its maximum efficiency. While a Toyota Prius is likely to convert fuel to motive energy on average at about 30% efficiency (well below the engine's 38% peak efficiency), the engine of a PHEV-70 would be likely to operate far more often near its peak efficiency because the batteries can serve the modest power needs at times when the combustion engine would be forced to run well below its peak efficiency. The actual efficiency achieved depends on losses from electricity generation, inversion, battery charging/discharging, the motor controller and motor itself, the way a vehicle is used (its duty cycle), and the opportunities to recharge by connecting to the electrical grid.

Also, electricity is multi-sourced and, as a result, it gives the greatest degree of energy resilience.

The actual fuel economy for PHEVs depends on their powertrain's operating modes, the all-electric range, and the amount of driving between charges. If no gasoline is used the miles per gallon gasoline equivalent (MPG-e) depends only on the efficiency of the electric system. The EPA also included in the Volt's fuel economy label a table showing fuel economy and electricity consumed for five different scenarios: 30, 45, 60 and  driven between a full charge, and a never charge scenario. According to this table the fuel economy goes up to  equivalent (MPG-e) with  driven between full charges.

For the more comprehensive fuel economy and environment label that will be mandatory in the U.S. beginning in model year 2013, the National Highway Traffic Safety Administration (NHTSA) and Environmental Protection Agency (EPA) issued two separate fuel economy labels for plug-in hybrids because of their design complexity, as PHEVS can operate in two or three operating modes: all-electric, blended, and gasoline-only. One label is for series hybrid or extended range electric vehicle (like the Chevy Volt), with all-electric and gasoline-only modes; and a second label for blended mode or series-parallel hybrid, that includes a combination of both gasoline and plug-in electric operation; and gasoline only, like a conventional hybrid vehicle.

The Society of Automotive Engineers (SAE) developed their recommended practice in 1999 for testing and reporting the fuel economy of hybrid vehicles and included language to address PHEVs. An SAE committee is currently working to review procedures for testing and reporting the fuel economy of PHEVs. The Toronto Atmospheric Fund tested ten retrofitted plug-in hybrid vehicles that achieved an average of 5.8 litres per 100 kilometre or 40.6 miles per gallon over six months in 2008, which was considered below the technology's potential.

In real world testing using normal drivers, some Prius PHEV conversions may not achieve much better fuel economy than HEVs. For example, a plug-in Prius fleet, each with a  all-electric range, averaged only  in a  test in Seattle, and similar results with the same kind of conversion battery models at Google's RechargeIT initiative. Moreover, the additional battery pack costs –.

Operating costs
A study published in 2014 by researchers from Lamar University, Iowa State University and Oak Ridge National Laboratory compared the operating costs of PHEVs of various electric ranges (10, 20, 30, and 40 miles) with conventional gasoline vehicles and non-plugin hybrid-electric vehicles (HEVs) for different payback periods, considering different charging infrastructure deployment levels and gasoline prices. The study concluded that:
 PHEVs save around 60% or 40% in energy costs, compared with conventional gasoline vehicles and HEVs, respectively.
The incremental battery cost of large-battery plug-in hybrids is difficult to justify based on the incremental savings of PHEVs' operating costs unless a subsidy is offered for large-battery PHEVs.
Although quick chargers can reduce charging time, they contribute little to energy cost savings for PHEVs, as opposed to Level-2 chargers.

Cost of batteries

Disadvantages of PHEVs include the additional cost, weight and size of a larger battery pack. According to the same study, even though costs are expected to decline by 35% by 2020, market penetration is expected to be slow and therefore PHEVs are not expected to significantly impact oil consumption or carbon emissions before 2030, unless a fundamental breakthrough in battery technologies occurs.

According to the 2010 NRC study, although a mile driven on electricity is cheaper than one driven on gasoline, lifetime fuel savings are not enough to offset plug-ins' high upfront costs, and it will take decades before the break-even point is achieved. Furthermore, hundreds of billions of dollars in government subsidies and incentives are likely to be required to achieve rapid plug-in market penetration in the U.S.

Cost reductions through advances in battery technology and higher production volumes will allow plug-in electric vehicles to be more competitive with conventional internal combustion engine vehicles.

A study published in 2011 by the Belfer Center, Harvard University, found that the gasoline costs savings of PHEVs over the vehicles' lifetimes do not offset their higher purchase prices. This finding was estimated comparing their lifetime net present value at 2010 purchase and operating costs for the U.S. market, and assuming no government subidies. According to the study estimates, a PHEV-40 is  more expensive than a conventional internal combustion engine, while a battery electric vehicle (BEV) is  more expensive. The study also examined how this balance will change over the next 10 to 20 years, assuming that battery costs will decrease while gasoline prices increase. Under the future scenarios considered, the study found that BEVs will be significantly less expensive than conventional cars ( to  cheaper), while PHEVs, will be more expensive than BEVs in almost all comparison scenarios, and only less expensive than conventional cars in a scenario with very low battery costs and high gasoline prices. BEVs are simpler to build and do not use liquid fuel, while PHEVs have more complicated powertrains and still have gasoline-powered engines.

Emissions shifted to electric plants
Increased pollution is expected to occur in some areas with the adoption of PHEVs, but most areas will experience a decrease. A study by the ACEEE predicts that widespread PHEV use in heavily coal-dependent areas would result in an increase in local net sulfur dioxide and mercury emissions, given emissions levels from most coal plants currently supplying power to the grid. Although clean coal technologies could create power plants which supply grid power from coal without emitting significant amounts of such pollutants, the higher cost of the application of these technologies may increase the price of coal-generated electricity. The net effect on pollution is dependent on the fuel source of the electrical grid (fossil or renewable, for example) and the pollution profile of the power plants themselves. Identifying, regulating and upgrading single point pollution source such as a power plant—or replacing a plant altogether—may also be more practical. From a human health perspective, shifting pollution away from large urban areas may be considered a significant advantage.

According to a 2009 study by The National Academy of Science, "Electric vehicles and grid-dependent (plug-in) hybrid vehicles showed somewhat higher nonclimate damages than many other technologies." Efficiency of plug-in hybrids is also impacted by the overall efficiency of electric power transmission. Transmission and distribution losses in the USA were estimated at 7.2% in 1995 and 6.5% in 2007. By life cycle analysis of air pollution emissions, natural gas vehicles are currently the lowest emitter.

Tiered rate structure for electric bills
The additional electrical consumption to recharge the plug-in vehicles could push many households in areas that do not have off-peak tariffs into the higher priced tier and negate financial benefits. Customers under such tariffs could see significant savings by being careful about when the vehicle was charged, for example, by using a timer to restrict charging to off-peak hours. Thus, an accurate comparison of the benefit requires each household to evaluate its current electrical usage tier and tariffs weighed against the cost of gasoline and the actual observed operational cost of electric mode vehicle operation.

Greenhouse gas emissions

The effect of PHEVs on greenhouse emissions is complex. Plug-in hybrid vehicles operating on all-electric mode do not emit harmful tailpipe pollutants from the onboard source of power. The clean air benefit is usually local because depending on the source of the electricity used to recharge the batteries, air pollutant emissions are shifted to the location of the generation plants. In the same way, PHEVs do not emit greenhouse gases from the onboard source of power, but from the point of view of a well-to-wheel assessment, the extent of the benefit also depends on the fuel and technology used for electricity generation. From the perspective of a full life cycle analysis, the electricity used to recharge the batteries must be generated from zero-emission sources such as renewable (e.g. wind power, solar energy or hydroelectricity) or nuclear power for PEVs to have almost none or zero well-to-wheel emissions. On the other hand, when PEVs are recharged from coal-fired plants, they usually produce slightly more greenhouse gas emissions than internal combustion engine vehicles. In the case of plug-in hybrid electric vehicle when operating in hybrid mode with assistance of the internal combustion engine, tailpipe and greenhouse emissions are lower in comparison to conventional cars because of their higher fuel economy.

Life cycle energy and emissions assessments

Argonne
In 2009, researchers at Argonne National Laboratory adapted their GREET model to conduct a full well-to-wheels (WTW) analysis of energy use and greenhouse gas (GHG) emissions of plug-in hybrid electric vehicles for several scenarios, considering different on-board fuels and different sources of electricity generation for recharging the vehicle batteries. Three US regions were selected for the analysis, California, New York, and Illinois, as these regions include major metropolitan areas with significant variations in their energy generation mixes. The full cycle analysis results were also reported for the US generation mix and renewable electricity to examine cases of average and clean mixes, respectively This 2009 study showed a wide spread of petroleum use and GHG emissions among the different fuel production technologies and grid generation mixes. The following table summarizes the main results:

The Argonne study found that PHEVs offered reductions in petroleum energy use as compared with regular hybrid electric vehicles. More petroleum energy savings and also more GHG emissions reductions were realized as the all-electric range increased, except when electricity used to recharge was dominated by coal or oil-fired power generation. As expected, electricity from renewable sources realized the largest reductions in petroleum energy use and GHG emissions for all PHEVs as the all-electric range increased. The study also concluded that plug-in vehicles that employ biomass-based fuels (biomass-E85 and -hydrogen) may not realize GHG emissions benefits over regular hybrids if power generation is dominated by fossil sources.

Oak Ridge
A 2008 study by researchers at Oak Ridge National Laboratory analyzed oil use and greenhouse gas (GHG) emissions of plug-in hybrids relative to hybrid electric vehicles under several scenarios for years 2020 and 2030. The study considered the mix of power sources for 13 U.S. regions that would be used during recharging of vehicles, generally a combination of coal, natural gas and nuclear energy, and to a lesser extent renewable energy. A 2010 study conducted at Argonne National Laboratory reached similar findings, concluding that PHEVs will reduce oil consumption but could produce very different greenhouse gas emissions for each region depending on the energy mix used to generate the electricity to recharge the plug-in hybrids.

Environmental Protection Agency

In October 2014, the U.S. Environmental Protection Agency published the 2014 edition of its annual report Light-Duty Automotive Technology, Carbon Dioxide Emissions, and Fuel Economy Trends. For the first time, the report presents an analysis of the impact of alternative fuel vehicles, with emphasis in plug-in electric vehicles because as their market share is approaching 1%, PEVs began to have a measurable impact on the U.S. overall new vehicle fuel economy and  emissions.

EPA's report included the analysis of 12 all-electric passengers cars and 10 plug-in hybrids available in the market as model year 2014. For purposes of an accurate estimation of emissions, the analysis took into consideration the differences in operation between those PHEVs like the Chevrolet Volt that can operate in all-electric mode without using gasoline, and those that operate in a blended mode like the Toyota Prius PHV, which uses both energy stored in the battery and energy from the gasoline tank to propel the vehicle, but that can deliver substantial all-electric driving in blended mode. In addition, since the all-electric range of plug-in hybrids depends on the size of the battery pack, the analysis introduced a utility factor as a projection, on average, of the percentage of miles that will be driven using electricity (in electric only and blended modes) by an average driver. The following table shows the overall EV/hybrid fuel economy expressed in terms of miles per gallon gasoline equivalent (mpg-e) and the utility factor for the ten MY2014 plug-in hybrids available in the U.S. market. The study used the utility factor (since in pure EV mode there are no tailpipe emissions) and the EPA best estimate of the  tailpipe emissions produced by these vehicles in real world city and highway operation based on the EPA 5-cycle label methodology, using a weighted 55% city/45% highway driving. The results are shown in the following table.

In addition, the EPA accounted for the upstream  emissions associated with the production and distribution of electricity required to charge the PHEVs. Since electricity production in the United States varies significantly from region to region, the EPA considered three scenarios/ranges with the low end of the range corresponding to the California powerplant emissions factor, the middle of the range represented by the national average powerplant emissions factor, and the upper end of the range corresponding to the powerplant emissions factor for the Rockies. The EPA estimates that the electricity GHG emission factors for various regions of the country vary from 346 g /kW-hr in California to 986 g /kW-hr in the Rockies, with a national average of 648 g /kW-hr. The following table shows the tailpipe emissions and the combined tailpipe and upstream emissions for each of the 10 MY 2014 PHEVs available in the U.S. market.

National Bureau of Economic Research
Most emission analysis use average emissions rates across regions instead of marginal generation at different times of the day. The former approach does not take into account the generation mix within interconnected electricity markets and shifting load profiles throughout the day. An analysis by three economist affiliated with the National Bureau of Economic Research (NBER), published in November 2014, developed a methodology to estimate marginal emissions of electricity demand that vary by location and time of day across the United States. The study used emissions and consumption data for 2007 through 2009, and used the specifications for the Chevrolet Volt (all-electric range of ). The analysis found that marginal emission rates are more than three times as large in the Upper Midwest compared to the Western U.S., and within regions, rates for some hours of the day are more than twice those for others. Applying the results of the marginal analysis to plug-in electric vehicles, the NBER researchers found that the emissions of charging PEVs vary by region and hours of the day. In some regions, such as the Western U.S. and Texas,  emissions per mile from driving PEVs are less than those from driving a hybrid car. However, in other regions, such as the Upper Midwest, charging during the recommended hours of midnight to 4 a.m. implies that PEVs generate more emissions per mile than the average car currently on the road. The results show a fundamental tension between electricity load management and environmental goals as the hours when electricity is the least expensive to produce tend to be the hours with the greatest emissions. This occurs because coal-fired units, which have higher emission rates, are most commonly used to meet base-level and off-peak electricity demand; while natural gas units, which have relatively low emissions rates, are often brought online to meet peak demand. This pattern of fuel shifting explains why emission rates tend to be higher at night and lower during periods of peak demand in the morning and evening.

Production and sales

Production models

Since 2008, plug-in hybrids have been commercially available from both specialty manufacturers and from mainstream producers of internal combustion engine vehicles. The F3DM, released in China in December 2008, was the first production plug-in hybrid sold in the world. The Chevrolet Volt, launched in the U.S. in December 2010, was the first mass-production plug-in hybrid by a major carmaker.

Sales and main markets

There were 1.2 million plug-in hybrid cars on the world roads at the end of 2017. The stock of plug-in hybrids increased to 1.8 million in 2018, out of a global stock of about 5.1 million plug-in electric passenger cars. , the United States ranked as the world's largest plug-in hybrid car market with a stock of 360,510 units, followed by China with 276,580 vehicles, Japan with 100,860 units, the Netherlands with 98,220, and the UK with 88,660.

Global sales of plug-in hybrids grew from over 300 units in 2010 to almost 9,000 in 2011, jumped to over 60,000 in 2012, and reached almost 222,000 in 2015. , the United States was the world's largest plug-in hybrid car market with a stock of 193,770 units. About 279,000 light-duty plug-in hybrids were sold in 2016, raising the global stock to almost 800,000 highway legal plug-in hybrid electric cars at the end of 2016. A total of 398,210 plug-in hybrid cars were sold in 2017, with China as the top selling country with 111,000 units, and the global stock of plug-in hybrids passed the one million unit milestone by the end of 2017.

Global sales of plug-in electric vehicles have been shifting for several years towards fully electric battery cars. The global ratio between all-electrics (BEVs) and plug-in hybrids (PHEVs) went from 56:44 in 2012, to 60:40 in 2015, to 66:34 in 2017, and rose to 69:31 in 2018.

By country

The Netherlands, Sweden, the UK, and the United States have the largest shares of plug-in hybrid sales as percentage of total plug-in electric passenger vehicle sales. The Netherlands has the world's largest share of plug-in hybrids among its plug-in electric passenger car stock, with 86,162 plug-in hybrids registered at the end of October 2016, out of 99,945 plug-in electric cars and vans, representing 86.2% of the country's stock of light-duty plug-in electric vehicles.

Sweden ranks next with 16,978 plug-in hybrid cars sold between 2011 and August 2016, representing 71.7% of total plug-in electric passenger car sales registrations. Plug-in hybrid registrations in the UK between up to August 2016 totaled 45,130 units representing 61.6% of total plug-in car registrations since 2011. In the United States, plug-in hybrids represent 47.2% of the 506,450 plug-in electric cars sold between 2008 and August 2016.

In November 2013 the Netherlands became the first country where a plug-in hybrid topped the monthly ranking of new car sales. During November sales were led by the Mitsubishi Outlander P-HEV with 2,736 units, capturing a market share of 6.8% of new passenger cars sold that month. Again in December 2013 the Outlander P-HEV ranked as the top selling new car in the country with 4,976 units, representing a 12.6% market share of new car sales. These record sales allowed the Netherlands to become the second country, after Norway, where plug-in electric cars have topped the monthly ranking of new car sales. , the Netherlands was the country with highest plug-in hybrid market concentration, with 1.45 vehicles registered per 1,000 people.

The following table presents the top ranking countries according to its plug-in hybrid segment market share of total new car sales in 2013:

By model

According to JATO Dynamics, since December 2018 the Mitsubishi Outlander P-HEV is the world's all-time best selling plug-in hybrid. Since inception, 290,000 units have been sold worldwide through September 2021. Europe is the Outlander P-HEV leading market with 126,617 units sold through January 2019, followed by Japan 42,451 units through March 2018. European sales are led by the UK with 50,000 units by April 2020, followed by the Netherlands with 25,489 units, and Norway with 14,196, both through March 2018.

Combined global sales of the Chevrolet Volt and its variants totaled about 186,000 units by the end of 2018, including about 10,000 Opel/Vauxhall Amperas sold in Europe through June 2016, and over 4,300 Buick Velite 5s sold only in China (rebadged second generation Volt) through December 2018. Volt sales are led by the United States with 152,144 units delivered through December 2018, followed by Canada with 17,311 units through November 2018. Until September 2018, the Chevrolet Volt was the world's top selling plug-in hybrid.

Ranking third is the Toyota Prius Plug-in Hybrid (Toyota Prius Prime) with about 174,600 units sold worldwide of both generations through December 2018. The United States is the leading market with over 93,000 units delivered through December 2018. Japan ranks next with about 61,200 units through December 2018, followed by Europe with almost 14,800 units through June 2018.

The following table presents plug-in hybrid models with cumulative global sales of around or more than 100,000 units since the introduction of the first modern production plug-in hybrid car, the BYD F3DM, in 2008 up until December 2020:

Government support and public deployment

Subsidies and economic incentives

Several countries have established grants and tax credits for the purchase of new plug-in electric vehicles (PEVs) including plug-in hybrid electric vehicles, and usually the economic incentive depends on battery size. As of April 2011, 15 of the 27 European Union member states provide tax incentives for electrically chargeable vehicles, which includes all Western European countries plus the Czech Republic and Romania. Also 17 countries levy carbon dioxide related taxes on passenger cars as a disincentive. The incentives consist of tax reductions and exemptions, as well as of bonus payments for buyers of all-electric and plug-in hybrid vehicles, hybrid vehicles, and some alternative fuel vehicles.

Other government support
United States

Incentives for the development of PHEVs are included in the Energy Independence and Security Act of 2007. The Energy Improvement and Extension Act of 2008, signed into law on October 3, 2008, grants a tax credits for the purchase of PHEVs. President Barack Obama's New Energy for America calls for deployment of 1 million plug-in hybrid vehicles by 2015, and on March 19, 2009, he announced programs directing $2.4 billion to electric vehicle development.

The American Recovery and Reinvestment Act of 2009 modifies the tax credits, including a new one for plug-in electric drive conversion kits and for 2 or 3 wheel vehicles. The ultimate total included in the Act that is going to PHEVs is over $6 billion.

In March 2009, as part of the American Recovery and Reinvestment Act, the US Department of Energy announced the release of two competitive solicitations for up to $2 billion in federal funding for competitively awarded cost-shared agreements for manufacturing of advanced batteries and related drive components as well as up to $400 million for transportation electrification demonstration and deployment projects. This announcement will also help meet the President Barack Obama's goal of putting one million plug-in hybrid vehicles on the road by 2015.

Public deployments also include:
 USDOE's FreedomCAR. US Department of Energy announced it would dole out $30 million in funding to three companies over three years to further the development of plug-in hybrids
 USDOE announced the selection of Navistar Corporation for a cost-shared award of up to $10 million to develop, test, and deploy plug-in hybrid electric (PHEV) school buses.
 DOE and Sweden have a MOU to advance market integration of plug-in hybrid vehicles
 PHEV Research Center
 San Francisco Mayor Gavin Newsom, San Jose Mayor Chuck Reed and Oakland, California Mayor Ron Dellums announced a nine-step policy plan for transforming the Bay Area into the "Electric Vehicle (EV) Capital of the U.S." and of the world There are partnerships with Coulomb, Better Place and others are also advancing. The first charging stations went up in San Jose (more information in Plug-in hybrids in California).
 Washington state PHEV Pilot Project
 Texas Governor Rick Perry's proposal for a state $5,000 tax credit for PHEVs in "non-attainment" communities
 Seattle, that includes City's public fleet converted vehicles, the Port of Seattle, King County and the Puget Sound Clean Air Agency

European Union
Electrification of transport (electromobility) is a priority in the European Union Research Programme. It also figures prominently in the European Economic Recovery Plan presented November 2008, in the frame of the Green Car Initiative. DG TREN will support a large European "electromobility" project on electric vehicles and related infrastructure with a total budget of around €50 million as part of the Green Car Initiative.

Supportive organizations
Organizations that support plug-in hybrids include the World Wide Fund for Nature, National Wildlife Federation, and CalCars.

Other supportive organizations are Plug In America, the Alliance for Climate Protection, Friends of the Earth, the Rainforest Action Network, Rocky Mountain Institute (Project Get Ready), the San Francisco Bay Area Council, the Apollo Alliance, the Set America Free Coalition, the Silicon Valley Leadership Group, and the Plug-in Hybrid Electric School Bus Project.

FPL and Duke Energy has said that by 2020 all new purchases of fleet vehicles will be plug-in hybrid or all-electric.

See also

 Advanced Technology Vehicles Manufacturing Loan Program
 Electric transportation technology
 Electric TM4
 Fuel economy-maximizing behaviors
 Genset trailer
 Glossary of automotive design
 Government incentives for plug-in electric vehicles
 Green vehicle
 History of the electric vehicle
 Hymotion
 Hypercar
 Inductive charging
 Patent encumbrance of large automotive NiMH batteries
 Phase-out of fossil fuel vehicles
 Plug In America
 Plug-in electric vehicle (PEV)
 Plug-in Hybrid Electric Vehicle Research Center
 Range anxiety
 List of hybrid and plug-in hybrid vehicles

References

Further reading 
 American Council for an Energy-Efficient Economy, Plug-in Electric Vehicles: Challenges and Opportunities, June 2013
 Argonne National Laboratory, Cradle-to-Grave Lifecycle Analysis of U.S. Light-Duty Vehicle-Fuel Pathways: A Greenhouse Gas Emissions and Economic Assessment of Current (2015) and Future (2025–2030) Technologies (includes estimated cost of avoided GHG emissions from BEVs and PHEVs), June 2016.
  
International Council on Clean Transportation, Driving Electrification – A Global Comparison of Fiscal Incentive Policy for Electric Vehicles, May 2014
 International Energy Agency (IEA) and Electric Vehicles Initiative (April 2013), Global EV Outlook 2013 – Understanding the Electric Vehicle Landscape to 2020
 International Energy Agency (IEA) – IA-HEV (May 2013), Hybrid and Electric Vehicles – The Electric Drive Gains Traction
 Lee, Henry, and Grant Lovellette (2011).Will Electric Cars Transform the U.S. Vehicle Market? Belfer Center, Harvard University
 
 
 
 Romm, Joseph J. and Fox-Penne, Peter. (2007). Plugging into the Grid: How Plug-In Hybrid-Electric Vehicles Can Help Break America's Oil Addiction and Slow Global Warming. Progressive Policy Institute.
 U.S. Environmental Protection Agency, Application of Life-Cycle Assessment to Nanoscale Technology: Lithium-ion Batteries for Electric Vehicles, April 2013.
 US Office of Energy Efficiency and Renewable Energy
 Plug-In Hybrid Electric Vehicle Value Proposition Study Final Report, July 2010.
 Plug-in Hybrid Electric Vehicles.
 Alternative Fuels and Advanced Vehicles Data Center (AFDC), including list of books and publications.
 US National Highway Traffic Safety Administration
Interim Guidance Electric and Hybrid Electric Vehicles Equipped with High Voltage Batteries – Vehicle Owner/General Public
Interim Guidance Electric and Hybrid Electric Vehicles Equipped with High Voltage Batteries – Law Enforcement/Emergency Medical Services/Fire Department

External links 

 Plug In America – Non-profit advocacy group.
 eGallon Calculator: Compare the costs of driving with electricity. U.S. Department of Energy.

 
Automotive technologies
Electric vehicle conversion
Electric vehicles